Englen i sort is a 1957 Danish family film directed by Sven Methling and starring Emil Hass Christensen.

Cast
 Emil Hass Christensen - Overlæge Arne Brandt
 Helle Virkner - Betina Brandt
 Dorthe Jørgensen - Lille Bente Brandt
 Poul Reichhardt - Lennart Sommer
 Ingeborg Brams - Elise Sommer
 Ellen Gottschalch - Fru Hennesen
 Knud Heglund - Simonsen
 Birgit Pouplier - Estella Simonsen
 Suzanne Bech - Sekretær hos Brandt
 Elsie Neubert - Sygeplejerske
 Bodil Miller - Lili
 Dyveke Reumert - Nora
 Vera Stricker
 Kjeld Jacobsen - Kriminalinspektør
 Karl Stegger - Flyttemand
 Holger Vistisen
 Thecla Boesen
 Albert Watson
 Johannes Marott - Portier på Hotel City
 Kjeld Vistisen

External links

1957 films
1950s Danish-language films
Films directed by Sven Methling
Danish black-and-white films